The Stampede International Tag Team Championship was the main tag team title in the Canadian professional wrestling promotion Stampede Wrestling. It was created in 1958 as the NWA International Tag Team Championship (Calgary version). When promoter Stu Hart resigned from the National Wrestling Alliance in 1982 the title was renamed the Stampede International Tag Team Championship. When Stampede wrestling closed down in 1989 the titles were retired, but brought back in 2000 when Stampede Wrestling was restarted by Bruce Hart and Ross Hart. and remained active until the promotion closed in 2008.

Title history

Footnotes

References

National Wrestling Alliance championships
International Tag Team
Tag team wrestling championships
International professional wrestling championships